The 61st Street–Woodside station (announced as the Woodside–61st Street station on trains) is an express station on the IRT Flushing Line of the New York City Subway located at 61st Street and Roosevelt Avenue in Woodside, Queens. It is served by the 7 train, with additional peak-direction <7> service during rush hours.

History

Early history 
The 1913 Dual Contracts called for the Interborough Rapid Transit Company (IRT) and Brooklyn Rapid Transit Company (BRT; later Brooklyn–Manhattan Transit Corporation, or BMT) to build new lines in Brooklyn, Queens, and the Bronx. Queens did not receive many new IRT and BRT lines compared to Brooklyn and the Bronx, since the city's Public Service Commission (PSC) wanted to alleviate subway crowding in the other two boroughs first before building in Queens, which was relatively undeveloped. The IRT Flushing Line was to be one of two Dual Contracts lines in the borough, along with the Astoria Line; it would connect Flushing and Long Island City, two of Queens' oldest settlements, to Manhattan via the Steinway Tunnel. When the majority of the line was built in the early 1910s, most of the route went through undeveloped land, and Roosevelt Avenue had not been constructed. Community leaders advocated for more Dual Contracts lines to be built in Queens to allow development there.

61st Street–Woodside opened on April 21, 1917 as Woodside, as part of an extension of the IRT Flushing Line to Alburtis Avenue (now 103rd Street–Corona Plaza). The Long Island Rail Road station predates the station, as it originally opened in 1869.

On February 29, 1928, five petitions signed with 600 names were sent to the New York State Transit Commission (NYSTC), requesting that an escalator be constructed at the station to the southeastern corner of 61st Street and Roosevelt Avenue. On July 25, the NYSTC ordered the Interborough Rapid Transit Company (IRT) to install a double-width escalator from the mezzanine to that corner, similar to one at the Third Avenue entrance at Grand Central station on the same line. The new escalator was placed into service on December 27, 1930.

Later years 
The city government took over the IRT's operations on June 12, 1940. The IRT routes were given numbered designations in 1948 with the introduction of "R-type" rolling stock, which contained rollsigns with numbered designations for each service. The route from Times Square to Flushing became known as the 7. On October 17, 1949, the joint BMT/IRT operation of the Flushing Line ended, and the line became the responsibility of the IRT. After the end of BMT/IRT dual service, the New York City Board of Transportation announced that the Flushing Line platforms would be lengthened to 11 IRT car lengths; the platforms were only able to fit nine 51-foot-long IRT cars beforehand. The platforms at the station were extended in 1955–1956 to accommodate 11-car trains. However, nine-car trains continued to run on the 7 route until 1962, when they were extended to ten cars. With the opening of the 1964 New York World's Fair, trains were lengthened to eleven cars. 

In 1981, the Metropolitan Transportation Authority (MTA) listed the station among the 69 most deteriorated stations in the subway system.

As part of the 2015–2019 Capital Program, the MTA would renovate the 52nd, 61st, 69th, 82nd, 103rd and 111th Streets stations, a project that has been delayed for several years but is slated to begin in mid-2020. Conditions at these stations were among the worst of all stations in the subway system.

Station layout

This station has two island platforms and three tracks. The two outer tracks are used for the full-time  local service while the bidirectional center track is used for rush hour peak-direction <7> express service. There is a mezzanine located at the center, underneath the platforms, with an ADA-accessible elevator to each platform, as well as another to each Long Island Rail Road platform. The elevator from the mezzanine to the street stops at the LIRR's eastbound Main Line platform.

Artwork includes John Cavanagh's Commuting/Community (1986), located near the stairway down to LIRR Track 4, and Dimitri Gerakaris' Woodside Continuum (1999), which forms part of the steel-grating fare-control separation.

Exits
Entrance and exit are provided by long stairs down to street level on the northern curb of Roosevelt Avenue at 61st Street, as well as to other nearby locations via the LIRR platforms. An ADA-compliant elevator provides access to street level at the northeast corner of 61st Street and Roosevelt Avenue, while a long escalator at the southeast corner provides entrance only. The Woodside station of the Long Island Rail Road is located directly beneath the Flushing Line station; any of the three LIRR platforms can be accessed directly from the mezzanine.

In popular culture
This station was used for a scene in John Cassavetes's 1980 film Gloria. The station was depicted in a scene in the Coen brothers' 2013 film Inside Llewyn Davis, though actual filming occurred elsewhere. A restaurant nearby the station was used in Law & Order: Organized Crime several times, the station was seen several times.

References

External links 

 
 nycsubway.org — Commuting/Community Artwork by John Cavanagh (1986)
 nycsubway.org — Woodside Continuum Artwork by Dimitri Gerakaris (1999)
 Station Reporter — 7 Train
 The Subway Nut — 61st Street–Woodside Pictures 
 MTA's Arts For Transit — Woodside–61st Street (IRT Flushing Line)
 61st Street entrance from Google Maps Street View
 Station as seen from the LIRR platforms from Google Maps Street View
 Platforms from Google Maps Street View

IRT Flushing Line stations
New York City Subway stations in Queens, New York
Railway stations in the United States opened in 1917
Woodside, Queens
1917 establishments in New York City